Carl Fredrik Liljevalch (10 July 1796, in Lund – 24 June 1870, in Stockholm) was a Swedish businessman, entrepreneur and diplomat. He was very active in the Swedish forest industry, organizing the country's first two circumnavigations. His son, Carl Fredrik Liljevalch Jr., had an estate which laid the foundation of Stockholm's Liljevalchs konsthall.

In the wake of the First Opium War, King Oscar I sent Liljevalch to China to conclude a commercial treaty with China. In March 1847, Liljevalch and Manchu statesman Qiying codified the Treaty of Canton, which was Sweden-Norway and China's first-ever treaty. The Treaty was almost identical to the Sino-American Treaty of Wanghia, which had been written three years earlier, and it gave Sweden-Norway the same privileges as other treaty powers. The treaty remained in force well into the twentieth century.

On returning home, Liljevalch published an account of his time in China called Chinas handel industri och statsförfattning jemte underrättelser om chinesernes folkbilding, seder och bruk samt notiser om Japan, Siam m. fl. (China's trade industry and government, and accounts of the education of the Chinese people; their customs and habits; and notices of Japan, Siam, and other.), in 1848. He settled on the island Gotland where he lived for several years, wanting to establish the cultivation of white beets for sugar production.

References

Article from Svenskt biografiskt handlexikon 

1796 births
1870 deaths
Swedish diplomats
Gotland
Knights of the Order of Vasa